TCG Yıldırım (F 243) is a  of the Turkish Navy.

Development and design 

Yavuz-class frigates were designed in Germany and are part of the MEKO family of modular warships; in this case the MEKO 200 design. An order for ships was signed by the Turkish government in April 1983 for four MEKO frigates. Two ships were built in Germany and two in Turkey with German assistance. They are similar in design to the larger s of the Turkish Navy, which are improved versions of the Yavuz-class frigate.

The Turkish Navy has an ongoing limited modernization project for an Electronic Warfare Suite. The intent is to upgrade the ships with locally produced the ECM, ECCM systems, active decoys, LWRs, IRST and the necessary user interface systems.

Construction and career 
Yıldırım was launched on 24 April 1987 by Gölcük Naval Shipyard in Kocaeli and commissioned on 22 July 1988.

17 February 2021, and TCG Yıldırım conducted an exercise in the Mediterranean Sea.

References

External links

 The First Upgraded MEKO 200 Frigate Of Turkish Navy
 BARBAROS CLASS ( MEKO 200 Track II) (Turkey)

1988 ships
Ships built at Gölcük Naval Shipyard
Yavuz-class frigates